This article lists political parties in Cambodia. Cambodia is a one-party dominant state with the Cambodian People's Party in power, while minor parties are allowed to operate as stated in the constitution.

Active parties

Parties currently represented in national or local government

Minor parties

Historical parties

Defunct parties

See also
 Elections in Cambodia
 Lists of political parties

References 

Cambodia
 
Political parties
Cambodia
Political parties